XXIV World Rhythmic Gymnastics Championships were held in Madrid, the capital of Spain, October 18–21, 2001

The Russian Team (Alina Kabaeva and Irina Tchachina) were stripped of their medals in individual and group results after tested positive to a banned diuretic at 2001 Goodwill Games, few months earlier. Ukraine became the gold medalist in Team, with Belarus Silver and Bulgaria moved up to Bronze.

Medal winners

Individual all-around

Individual Rope

Individual Hoop

Individual Ball

Individual Clubs

Team All-Around

References

Rhythmic Gymnastics World Championships
Rhythmic Gymnastics Championships
Rhythmic Gymnastics Championships
Gyn